Aditi Govitrikar (born 21 May 1974) is an Indian actress, physician and former model. She is the first Indian woman to win the Mrs. World title in 2001. From 1997 to 2004, Govitrikar remained the only Indian supermodel with both a medical doctor and a psychologist qualification. She has been touted by Hindustan Times as "Beauty with Brains". She is a vegetarian and ardent Vipassana practitioner. She was a contestant on  Fear Factor: Khatron Ke Khiladi 1 and Bigg Boss 3. Govitrikar won the Gladrags Megamodel Contest in 1996 and the Gladrags Mrs. India in 2000, subsequently winning Mrs. World Contest in 2001. She ventured into acting when she played a prominent role in Thammudu (1999), a movie that was a runaway hit. She went on to act in many movies including Paheli (2005) India's official entry to the 79th Academy Awards and De Dana Dan (2009), that won an award at the International Indian Film Academy Award. She also played a leading role in several super hit music videos such as Kabhi to Nazar Milao by Adnan Sami and Asha Bhosle (1997) and Aaeena by Jagjit Singh (2000). In 2020, she hosted the show Mother's Care on Zee Zest. She launched PETA in India and has also endorsed top tier international brands such as Coca-Cola, Chopard, Fendi and Harry Winston.

Early life
Govitrikar was born in Panvel, Maharashtra on 21 May 1976. After attending Barns High School in Panvel, she subsequently went to Grant Medical College in Mumbai where she graduated with an MBBS medical degree in 1997. After completing a postgraduate MS degree in Obstetrics and Gynaecology, Govitrikar ventured into modelling.

Career

She started her career as a model after winning the Gladrags Megamodel Contest in 1996. She also won the best body and best face prizes at the Asian Super Model Contest in 1997. She modeled for companies such as Kaya Skin Clinic, Pond's and appeared in TV commercials, including her immensely popular Coca-Cola ad with Hrithik Roshan.

Since winning Mrs. World 2001, Govitrikar continued modeling and also appeared in minor roles in a number of Bollywood and South Indian films. She has acted in the Hindi TV serial Ye Meri Life Hai and participated in reality television series such Fear Factor - Khatron Ke Khiladi (2008), hosted by Akshay Kumar, and in the reality television series, Bigg Boss (Season 3) (2009).

Personal life
Despite early parental opposition, she married a Dawoodi Bohra Muslim medical school senior, Muffazal Lakdawala, whom she met while still in college and dated for over 7 years. The couple married in 1998 under both civil and Muslim law and she took the name Sarah Lakdawala. They have a daughter Kiara, who was born in 1999. The couple had another baby in May 2007. 

She is divorced from Muffazal Lakdawala.

Govitrikar has a younger sister, Arzoo Govitrikar, who is an electronics engineer-turned-actress. She was a judge on the show Kalakarz.

Recently she completed her post graduate course in counselling from Tata Institute of Social Sciences and obtained a master's degree in psychology from IGNOU. She is currently pursuing a second master's degree in psychology from Harvard University. She has been honoured with Life Membership of International Women's Film Forum of Asian Academy of Film and Television.

Filmography

Films

Television Series

Music Videos 

 Baarish Ho Rahi Hai (By Anu Malik)
 Kabhi To Nazar Milao (By Adnan Sami)

Television

Awards and nominations

References

External links

 
 

1976 births
Living people
Indian film actresses
Mrs. World winners
Indian Hindus
Actresses in Hindi cinema
Actresses from Mumbai
Indian television actresses
Participants in Indian reality television series
Indian beauty pageant winners
Female models from Mumbai
Actresses in Hindi television
21st-century Indian actresses
Fear Factor: Khatron Ke Khiladi participants
Bigg Boss (Hindi TV series) contestants
Harvard University alumni